Muskeg Lake 102E is an Indian reserve of the Muskeg Lake Cree Nation in Saskatchewan. It is 49 kilometres south of Shellbrook. In the 2016 Canadian Census, it recorded a population of 0 living in 0 of its 0 total private dwellings.

References

Indian reserves in Saskatchewan
Division No. 16, Saskatchewan